Hot Slots, or , is a slot machine simulation video game for the Nintendo Entertainment System developed by Idea-Tek, and published by Hacker International/Panesian in 1991.

AV Pachisuro is the title of the Japanese release for the Family Computer (or Famicom); Hot Slots (titled Hot Slot in-game) is the English-language version of the game published for the NES. The title AV Pachisuro combines the Japanese-coined English initialism AV (adult video) with the Japanese contracted word pachisuro (a portmanteau of pachinko and slot).

Gameplay
To begin a game, the player chooses one of three slot machines: Cutie Bunny, Juicy Fruits, or Las Vegas. Each machine has a distinct visual design and musical score. After purchasing "medallions" (token coins), the player may play up to five medallions in a machine for each pull. The player stops each reel by pressing a direction on the D-pad. Between spins, the player can optionally switch to another machine.

Hot Slots is an eroge, a video game that rewards game progress, persistence, or performance with images that are sexually explicit or suggestive. Each slot machine is accompanied by a scantily-clad hostess, who appears at intervals when the player's winnings surpass a certain threshold.  When the player nets a profit of $210, the game displays a full-screen cartoon image of the partially clothed hostess with a caption or speech balloon. At a net profit of $300, she loses more of her clothing; at $450, she appears nude.

Reception
Allgame gave the game a rating of 1 star out of a possible 5.

See also
 Peek-A-Boo Poker (1990)
 Magic Bubble (1991)
 List of Family Computer games
 List of Nintendo Entertainment System games

References

External links
 Hot Slots at MobyGames

1991 video games
Erotic video games
Casino video games
Pachislot video games
Unauthorized video games
Nintendo Entertainment System-only games
Video games developed in Japan
Nintendo Entertainment System games
Video games developed in Taiwan